Paranju Theeratha Visheshangal is a Malayalam language film starring Suresh Gopi & Lakshmi Gopalaswamy in the lead roles. It was released in 2007.

Cast 
 Suresh Gopi as Rajeevan
 Lakshmi Gopalaswamy as Vijayalakshmi
 Janardhanan (actor) as Raghavan Nair
 Manya as Anjana Menon
 Jagathy Sreekumar as Samuel
 Sukumari as Rajeevan's mother

References

External links
 * 

2007 films
2000s Malayalam-language films